Charles Robert Larson (November 20, 1936 – July 26, 2014) was an Admiral of the United States Navy.

Military career
A 1958 graduate of the United States Naval Academy, Larson twice served as Superintendent of the U.S. Naval Academy in Annapolis, Maryland.  He also served as Commander in Chief, United States Pacific Command (CINCPAC). 

After graduation from the U.S. Naval Academy in 1958, Larson reported to NAS Pensacola, Florida, to enter flight training. Upon his completion, as a Naval Aviator, he reported to Attack Squadron 176 (VA-176) aboard the aircraft carrier , where he served until April 1963 in flying the A-1H Skyraider.

He was the first naval officer selected as a White House Fellow and served his fellowship in 1968 as Special Assistant to the Secretary of the Interior. From 1969 to 1971, he served as Naval Aide to the President of the United States. He reported back to sea duty as executive officer of the nuclear attack submarine . Then from 1973 to 1976, he served as commanding officer of the nuclear attack submarine . In 1976, Larson assumed duties as Commander, Submarine Development Group ONE in San Diego, California, in which he headed the Navy's worldwide deep submergence program.

He was promoted to four-star rank in February 1990 upon being assigned as Commander in Chief, U.S. Pacific Fleet, the Navy component commander in the Pacific Theater. After one year in the position, he was nominated by the President, and assumed duties, as Commander in Chief, U.S. Pacific Command.

Awards and decorations

Larson has also been decorated by the governments of Japan, Thailand, France and Korea.

Civilian career
Larson was a founder, director and chairman of the board of ViaGlobal Group. , he also served on the Board of Directors of Northrop Grumman Corporation and the Board of Esterline Corporation. He also served on three corporate boards in the fields of electrical power generation and distribution, oil exploration and production and international service and construction.

In 2002, after switching parties to become a Democrat, Larson ran unsuccessfully for Lieutenant Governor of Maryland, on the ticket with Democrat Kathleen Kennedy Townsend. 

Larson became an Eagle Scout in 1950 and as an adult was a recipient of the Distinguished Eagle Scout Award from the Boy Scouts of America.

His public service boards include the National Academy of Sciences Committee on International Security and Arms Control, The White House Fellows Foundation, The Board of Regents of the University System of Maryland, The Board of Trustees of the Anne Arundel Health System, Board of Directors of The Atlantic Council and as Chairman of the Board of Directors of the US Naval Academy Foundation.

Larson and his wife, Sally, lived in Annapolis, where he died on July 26, 2014, as a result of pneumonia, after being afflicted with leukemia for two years. He was interred at the United States Naval Academy Cemetery. Larson had reserved four plots at the Academy cemetery for himself, his classmate and close friend Senator John McCain, and their wives. McCain died on August 25, 2018 (at the age of 81), and was buried on September 2 in the plot next to Larson; the admiral's widow Sally remarked that "Chuck has his wingman back now".

Awards
Larson's civilian awards include:
 Paul Harris Fellow (Rotary International’s highest award for public service).
 VFW National Armed Forces Award (1998)
 Navy League’s Annual Leadership Award (1998)
 “All American Citizen” by the city of Omaha, Nebraska
Omaha North High School Vikings of Distinction
 The United States Naval Academy Alumni Association’s Distinguished Graduate Award

See also

List of Superintendents of the United States Naval Academy

References

External links

ViaGlobal Group official website

United States Navy admirals
Superintendents of the United States Naval Academy
Directors of Northrop Grumman
1936 births
2014 deaths
People from Sioux Falls, South Dakota
Military personnel from South Dakota
Recipients of the Legion of Merit
Recipients of the Defense Distinguished Service Medal
Recipients of the Navy Distinguished Service Medal
Deaths from cancer in Maryland
Deaths from leukemia
Maryland Republicans
Maryland Democrats
Burials at the United States Naval Academy Cemetery
Omaha North High School alumni